Xanthorhoe annotinata is a moth of the family Geometridae. It is found in the northern part of the Palearctic realm. It is found in mountainous areas.

The wingspan is 22–30 mm. There is one generation per year with adults on wing from mid June to July.

The larvae have been recorded feeding on Vaccinium myrtillus. Larvae can be found from July to May. The species overwinters in the larval stage.

References

 (1986) The geometroid moths of North Europe (Lepidoptera, Drepanidae and Geometridae) Leiden, Kopenhagen: E.J. Brill/Scandinavian Science Press, p. 76.

Xanthorhoe
Moths of Europe